Abadia de Goiás is a municipality in central Goiás state, Brazil, located on the western edge of the Goiânia metropolitan area.

Geographical Data
The distance to Goiânia is 27 km. and highway connections are made by BR-060.

Neighboring municipalities are:
north and east:  Trindade
northwest:  Goiânia
east:  Guapó
south:  Aragoiânia

Demographic and Political Data
Population density: 40.07 inhabitants/km2 (2007)
Urban population: 3,963 (2007)
Rural population: 1,905 (2007)
Eligible voters in 2007: 4683
City government in 2005: mayor (Antomar Moreira dos Santos), vice-mayor (Maria Lúcia das Graças Matias), and 09 councilpersons
Households: 1,398 (2000)
Households earning less than 01 minimum salary: 872 (2000)

Economy
The economy is based on services, government jobs, small industries, cattle raising, poultry, and agriculture.

Main Enterprises
agriculture: 04 units employing 42 workers
transformation industry: 13 units employing 53 workers
construction: 07 units employing 21 workers
commerce: 57 units employing 142 workers
real estate: 31 units employing 62 workers
education: 03 units employing 12 workers
health: 04 units employing 07 workers
public administration: 03 units employing 168 workers
(IBGE 2003)

The cattle herd consisted of 17,460 head, of which 1,930 were milking cows (2006).  The main agricultural products were rice, manioc, and corn.

Health and education
Infant mortality rate in 2000: 27.70 (28.50 in 1990)
Literacy rate in 2000: 89.2
There were no hospitals in 2007.  There were 06 schools with an enrollment of 1,810.
Source: IBGE

Human Development Index:  0.742
State ranking:  101 (out of 242 municipalities)
National ranking:  2,112 (out of 5,507 municipalities)

See also
List of municipalities in Goiás

References

Frigoletto

Municipalities in Goiás